Wuhou District is one of 12 urban districts of the prefecture-level city of Chengdu, the capital of Sichuan Province, Southwest China. It contains the historic site, Wuhou Temple and Jinli Street. The district is bordered by Jinjiang District to the east, Shuangliu County to the south and west, and Qingyang District to the north.

Wuhou District is the largest of the five internal districts of Chengdu as well as being the wealthiest. It contains the areas of Yulin and Shuangnan which are considered to be the two areas of Chengdu with the highest living standards. The name "Wuhou" is short for "Wu-Xiang Hou", which is an honorary title given to Zhuge Liang who lived in Chengdu when he served as the chancellor in the Shu Han kingdom during the Three Kingdoms period.

Diplomatic missions
Until its closure in 2020, the U.S. Consulate in Chengdu was in Wuhou District.

Education

Southwest University for Nationalities maintains its main campus in Wuhou District.

The Chengdu Hoshuko (Japanese: 成都日本語補習校 Chentū Nihongo Hoshūkō), a Japanese supplementary weekend school, holds its classes in the Hiroshima-Chengdu Friendship Center (Japanese: 広島・四川中日友好会館, Simp. Chinese: 广岛 ·四川中日友好会馆) in Wuhou District. It was established on February 12, 2012.

References

External links

Districts of Chengdu